"Aguanilé" is a song composed by American-Puerto Rican trombonist Willie Colón and Puerto Rican singer Héctor Lavoe and being recorded by themselves as the first single from their seventh studio album El Juicio released in 1972. Its origin comes from the Yoruba culture in Cuba and means "spiritual cleansing for your house" perhaps referring to Lavoe's drug problems.

The song has a small verse that is interpreted by Lavoe in Greek: "Kyrie eleison", which means: "Lord have mercy", belonging to the ordinary of the mass. The song was produced by Colón himself along with Fania Records co-founder Jerry Masucci.

Background 
In 1970, the album Asalto Navideño was released, where Colón and Lavoe demonstrated that they could win over the Latino public and the local public in the Bronx. With hits like "La Murga", "Esta Navidad", "Aires de Navidad" which finished consecrating the musical career of both artists. Lavoe's drug problems began to worsen and this behavior began to alienate his partner Colón little by little, so to compensate for his problems they convinced the trombonist to compose a song that had more sentimental meaning and more instrumentalism where Milton Cardona stands out. in the congas.

Music and lyrics 
"Aguanilé" was written and produced by Colón and Lavoe. The song is about a man who longs for a Latin public attention and wants to know how she feels about him. The song opens with a trombone and piano riff, which is immediately followed congas and timbales followed by the voice of Lavoe. It fuses the sound of contemporary Boogaloo and incorporates Latin percussion instruments the timbales, congas, maracas, trombones and the trumpet.

Marc Anthony version 

Puerto Rican-American singer-songwriter Marc Anthony recorded a cover version of the song for his soundtrack album El Cantante in 2007. Anthony bought six hundred records to listen and select the songs that would be included on the album, the first of other cover albums that he will be releasing under this concept. Anthony recorded "Mi Gente", "El Día de Mi Suerte" and "Qué Lío", written by Colón, Lavoe and Joe Cuba, since the songs were "related to his taste in music and who he was".

Charts

See also 

 2007 in Latin music

References 

1972 singles
2007 singles
2013 songs
Willie Colón songs
Héctor Lavoe songs
Marc Anthony songs
Sony Music Latin singles
Spanish-language songs
Salsa songs
Song recordings produced by Sergio George